Alma is a town in Ellis County, Texas, United States. The population was 331 at the 2010 census.

Geography

Demographics

As of the census of 2000, there were 302 people, 107 households, and 83 families residing in the town. The population density was 60.0 people per square mile (23.2/km2). There were 114 housing units at an average density of 22.7 per square mile (8.8/km2). The racial makeup of the town was 91.06% White, 3.64% African American, 5.30% from other races. Hispanic or Latino of any race were 5.96% of the population.

There were 107 households, out of which 37.4% had children under the age of 18 living with them, 67.3% were married couples living together, 8.4% had a female householder with no husband present, and 21.5% were non-families. 19.6% of all households were made up of individuals, and 7.5% had someone living alone who was 65 years of age or older. The average household size was 2.82 and the average family size was 3.23.

In the town, the population was spread out, with 28.5% under the age of 18, 8.6% from 18 to 24, 27.8% from 25 to 44, 23.8% from 45 to 64, and 11.3% who were 65 years of age or older. The median age was 38 years. For every 100 females, there were 92.4 males. For every 100 females age 18 and over, there were 91.2 males.

The median income for a household in the town was $46,250, and the median income for a family was $57,500. Males had a median income of $37,500 versus $14,205 for females. The per capita income for the town was $14,947. About 3.7% of families and 7.6% of the population were below the poverty line, including 9.3% of those under the age of eighteen and 8.3% of those sixty five or over.

The town of Alma has zero property taxes. It relies solely upon sales tax for its revenues.

Education
The town of Alma is served by the Ennis Independent School District.

References

Dallas–Fort Worth metroplex
Towns in Ellis County, Texas
Towns in Texas